Billy Jacobson, also known as the "Riding Machine" (born 2 May 1980, Durban, South Africa), is a South African jockey currently riding in South Africa.

Billy Jacobson is known as the "Riding Machine" in Mauritius for having a fall in his first meeting in Mauritius and coming out unhurt. Billy Jacobson has been trading his mark in Spain, France, Zimbabwe, Dubai and Mauritius.

References
 The Riding Machine Interview of Bill Jacobson by the Turf Magazine Mauritius (Retrieved 12 September 2009)

1980 births
Living people
Sportspeople from Durban
South African jockeys